Karakara is a town and commune in the Dosso Region of southern Niger. It had a population of 44,333 as of 2012.

References

Communes of Niger
Dosso Region